Burnout is a racing video game developed by Criterion Games and published by Acclaim Entertainment for the PlayStation 2, GameCube and Xbox.

Burnout is the first of the eponymous series of high-speed racing games noted for over-the-top crashes and high-risk gameplay mechanics.

Gameplay
The main gameplay mode in Burnout is the Championship mode, which is a selection of events with three or four races in each. Here the player competes against three other cars on various courses styled on European and American locations. Each event gets harder and requires the player to use faster cars to reach first place. After completing each event, a Face Off challenge is unlocked which in turn unlocks a new car if won. Other modes include single race, time attack, and 2-Player. Single race is a mode where the player races against three opponents. In a time attack, the player must finish a lap in a certain amount of time.

Each location is connected in "Sprints", so hypothetically one could drive from River City (Paris) and end up in Harbour Town (the Costa del Sol) in a matter of seconds. On completion of all the 'European' and 'American' events, two 'endurance' modes are unlocked, allowing the player to drive through both these locations in a single race, as well as the three American locations. Completing these can take between 15 and 20 minutes. Each location has a distinct collection of traffic that distinguishes one continent from the next; e.g. American taxi cabs versus European taxi cabs and so forth.

Burnout features a small collection of cars, including the small Supermini, the Saloon, the Pickup and the Muscle.

The tracks feature road traffic, oncoming traffic, cross junctions, and obstacles which can make driving at high speeds difficult. To travel faster, the player needs to accumulate Boost. The Boost meter can be powered up by driving down the wrong side of the road, drifting around corners at high speeds, narrowly avoiding traffic, completing a lap without crashing, or swerving to avoid a collision. Colliding with traffic or scenery will cause the car to crash. The crash is then shown from several different angles, and a replacement car then appears without damage, but with a loss of some accumulated boost. The accumulated boost can only be unlocked by filling the boost meter. This can then be used to produce a Burnout (an increased acceleration of the vehicle) until the boost meter is empty. While the boost is activated, the player can continue to drive dangerously which rewards the player with more boost in their bar when their original boost bar is fully depleted, allowing the driver to chain burnouts together if they are skilled enough. Burnout Dominator attempted to bring back the Burnout feature, which was changed in releases between the 2 games.

Development
Burnout was in development for almost two years prior to its release in November 2001.

Reception

Burnout received "favourable" reviews on all platforms according to video game review aggregator Metacritic.

References

External links

2001 video games
Acclaim Entertainment games
Burnout (series)
Criterion Games games
GameCube games
Multiplayer and single-player video games
PlayStation 2 games
RenderWare games
Video games developed in the United Kingdom
Video games set in Europe
Video games set in the United States
Xbox games

de:Burnout (Spieleserie)#Burnout